Clam is a commune with 418 residents (as of January 1, 2017) in the French department of Charente-Maritime in the Poitou-Charentes region. Clam is located in the arrondissement (eng. administrative region) as well as in the canton of Jonzac. The residents are called Clamais.

Geography 
Clam lies about 80 kilometers northeast of Bourdeaux. Clam is bordered by Marignac to the north and northwest, Neulles to the north and northeast, Saint-Germain-de-Luisignan to the south and east, as well as Saint-Georges-Antignac to the west.

Population

Places of interest 

 The Church of Saint-Martin from the 12th century.

See also 
 Communes of the Charente-Maritime department

References

External links
 

Communes of Charente-Maritime